The 1988 Scheldeprijs was the 75th edition of the Scheldeprijs cycle race and was held on 26 April 1988. The race was won by Jean-Paul van Poppel.

General classification

References

1988
1988 in road cycling
1988 in Belgian sport